The 1901–02 Scottish Division Two was won by Port Glasgow Athletic.

Table

References

Scottish Football Archive

Scottish Division Two seasons
2